The Mortlake line is a closed railway line in the west of Victoria, Australia. Branching off of the main Port Fairy railway line at Terang, then running North to the small town of Mortlake, Victoria.

History

The original idea for a railway line serving Mortlake was first tabled in the 1870s. The line had been completed, but not used until 1889, when the Mortlake Despatch ran a newspaper article questioning why the line was not yet in operation. The line was officially opened on 4 February 1890. Soon after, additional facilities were provided, such as a windmill, 10 ton weighbridge and stockyards. The Koonendah Railway Station Post Office opened on 1 December 1890 but closed in 1891.

The line was closed to all traffic on Tuesday, 1 August 1978. Dismantling of the line occurred during May/June 1988.

Line guide

References

External links

Closed regional railway lines in Victoria (Australia)
Transport in Barwon South West (region)